"Life Is a Long Song" is a song composed by Ian Anderson and first recorded by Jethro Tull. It was released as the lead track on an EP of the same name on 3 September 1971, which reached No. 11 in the UK charts. The song later appeared on the 1972 compilation album Living in the Past.

The song is centred around Anderson's acoustic guitar playing, and the lyrics talking about everyday life, concluding that "the tune ends too soon for us all". It is the first Jethro Tull recording to feature drummer Barriemore Barlow, who had joined the group shortly before.

Fairport Convention covered the song on their 1997 album Who Knows Where the Time Goes.

References
Citations

Sources

 

Jethro Tull (band) songs
1971 songs
Songs written by Ian Anderson
Song recordings produced by Ian Anderson